Gary Ward (born September 9, 1940) is an American former baseball coach. He was the head baseball coach at Oklahoma State University from 1978 to 1996, compiling a record of 953–313–1. Ward won 16 Big Eight Conference championships at OSU, including 14 in a row from 1982 to 1995. He led his team to 18 40-win seasons, and 12 times his teams finished in the top 10. He later became the head baseball coach at New Mexico State University. During his tenure, he became only the 24th coach in college baseball history to gain 1,000 career wins.

From 1971 to 1979, he served as the head baseball coach at Yavapai Junior College. He compiled a 240–83 record, including two national championships in 1975 and 1977. From 1963 to 1969, he was the head baseball and basketball coach at Collinsville (OK) High School. He played baseball and basketball at New Mexico State.

Ward now serves as the Chairman of the Advisory Board for 3D Sports Partners, Inc.

Head coaching record

College

References

1940 births
Living people
New Mexico State Aggies baseball coaches
New Mexico State Aggies men's basketball players
Northeastern Oklahoma A&M Golden Norsemen basketball players
Northeastern Oklahoma A&M Golden Norsemen baseball players
Oklahoma State Cowboys baseball coaches
High school baseball coaches in the United States
High school basketball coaches in the United States
National College Baseball Hall of Fame inductees
People from Washington County, Oklahoma
Yavapai Roughriders baseball coaches
American men's basketball players